Chamblee is a surname. Notable people with the surname include:

Brandel Chamblee (born 1962), American golfer, commentator and writer
Eddie Chamblee (1920–1999), American tenor and alto saxophonist, and vocalist
Jim Chamblee (born 1975), American baseball player
Jones M. Chamblee (born 1936), American politician